9mm Grudge is the second studio album by Non-Aggression Pact, released in March 1994 by Re-Constriction Records. The album peaked at #21 on the CMJ RPM Charts.

Reception
Aiding & Abetting gave 9mm Grudge a positive review, calling it "a pleasant industrial-dance outing, with lyrics more biting than the background noise." Option said "the thing that distinguishes Non-Aggression Pact from every other industrial dance project is the overload of vague, anti-racism voice samples that are littered throughout this disc."

Track listing

Personnel
Adapted from the 9mm Grudge liner notes.

Non-Aggression Pact
 Jeff Hillard – drums, keyboards, sampler, programming, production, engineering, photography, remix (8)
 Jason Whitcomb – lead vocals, keyboards, sampler, programming, production, engineering

Additional performers
 Dan Bates – bass guitar (9, 13), scratching (13)

Production and design
 Chase – design
 Ben Dunn – illustrations
 Trevor Henthorn – mastering
 Theresa Milam – cover art, typesetting
 Joseph Wight – illustrations

Release history

References

External links 
 9mm Grudge at Discogs (list of releases)

1994 albums
Non-Aggression Pact (band) albums
Re-Constriction Records albums